The 32nd Canadian Parliament was in session from April 14, 1980, until July 9, 1984. The membership was set by the 1980 federal election on February 18, 1980, and it only changed slightly due to resignations and by-elections prior to being dissolved before the 1984 election.

It was controlled by a Liberal Party majority, led first by Prime Minister Pierre Trudeau and the 22nd Canadian Ministry, and then by Prime Minister John Turner and the 23rd Canadian Ministry. The Official Opposition was the Progressive Conservative Party, led first by Joe Clark, and then Brian Mulroney.

The Speaker was Jeanne Sauvé then Cyril Lloyd Francis. See also List of Canadian electoral districts 1976-1987 for a list of the ridings in this parliament.

There were two sessions of the 32nd Parliament:

Party standings

The party standings as of the election and as of dissolution were as follows:

* After dissolution but before turning over power, Prime Minister John Turner filled ten of the Senate vacancies with Liberal members, for a total caucus of 74.

Members of the House of Commons 
Members of the House of Commons in the 32nd parliament arranged by province.

Newfoundland

Prince Edward Island

Nova Scotia 

* Elmer MacKay resigned his seat to give new Tory leader Brian Mulroney a place in the Commons after an August 1983 by-election.

New Brunswick

Quebec 

* Roch La Salle resigned from parliament on March 17, 1981, to become leader of Quebec's Union Nationale party.  After this party suffered a major defeat in the 1981 Quebec election, La Salle resigned as leader and was re-elected to his old position in an August 17 by-election.
** Raynald Guay left parliament on August 29, 1980, and was replaced by Gaston Gourde in a May 4, 1981, by-election.

Ontario 

* Bob Rae left parliament to become leader of the Ontario NDP and was replaced by Lynn McDonald in 1982.
** Lincoln Alexander left parliament to become head of the Worker's Compensation Board and was replaced by Stanley Hudecki in a 1980 by-election.
*** Thomas Cossitt died in office and was replaced by Jennifer Cossitt in a 1982 by-election
† Judd Buchanan resigned from parliament and was replaced by Jack Burghardt in an April 13, 1981, by-election
†† Peter Stollery was appointed to the Senate and was replaced by Dan Heap in an August 17, 1981, by-election
††† Bruce Lonsdale died in office and was replaced by John MacDougall in an October 12, 1982, by-election.

Manitoba 

* Walter Dinsdale died in office and was replaced by Lee Clark in a May 24, 1983, by-election

Saskatchewan

Alberta

British Columbia 

* Mark Rose left Parliament and was replaced by Gerry St. Germain in an August 29, 1983, by-election

Territories

By-elections

References

Succession 

 
Canadian parliaments
1980 establishments in Canada
1984 disestablishments in Canada
1980 in Canadian politics
1981 in Canadian politics
1982 in Canadian politics
1983 in Canadian politics
1984 in Canadian politics